The following radio stations broadcast on FM frequency 89.7 MHz:

Argentina
 LRV362 in Franck, Santa Fe
 Radio María in Quitilipi, Chaco
 Radio María in San José de Feliciano, Entre Ríos
 Radio María in Los Antiguos, Santa Cruz
 Radio María in Venado Tuerto, Santa Fe

Australia
 2KY in Lithgow, New South Wales
 2RES in Sydney, New South Wales
 Rhema FM in Tamworth, New South Wales
 Radio TAB in Gold Coast, Queensland
 5TCB in Naracoorte, South Australia
 5PBA in Adelaide, South Australia
 Triple J in Warrnambool, Victoria
 6TCR in Perth, Western Australia

Canada (Channel 209)
 CBCG-FM in Elk Lake, Ontario
 CBCM-FM in Penetanguishene, Ontario
 CBCX-FM in Calgary, Alberta
 CBEB-FM in Manitouwadge, Ontario
 CBF-FM-20 in Saint-Donat, Quebec
 CBKQ-FM in Dawson Creek, British Columbia
 CBM-FM-1 in Sherbrooke, Quebec
 CBU-FM-3 in Kelowna, British Columbia
 CFWN-FM in Cobourg, Ontario
 CHDO-FM in Dorval, Quebec (On 88.1 MHz)
 CJNG-FM in Quebec City, Quebec
 CJSU-FM in Duncan, British Columbia
 CKGN-FM in Kapuskasing, Ontario
 CKOA-FM in Glace Bay, Nova Scotia
 VF2315 in Avola, British Columbia
 VF2494 in New Hazelton, British Columbia
 VF7332 in Whistler, British Columbia
 VOAR-4-FM in Gander, Newfoundland and Labrador

Guatemala (Channel 5)

TGTO-FM in Guatemala City

Japan
JODW-FM in Tokyo

Malaysia
 Ai FM in Negeri Sembilan
 TraXX FM in Kuala Terengganu, Terengganu

Mexico
XEOYE-FM in Mexico City
XHAK-FM in Acámbaro, Guanajuato
XHCUM-FM in Cuautla, Morelos
XHDP-FM in Ciudad Cuauhtémoc, Chihuahua
XHEDL-FM in Hermosillo, Sonora
XHEPA-FM in Puebla (Santa María Coronango), Puebla
XHID-FM in Álamo, Veracruz
XHIP-FM in Uruapan, Michoacán
XHKJ-FM in Acapulco, Guerrero
XHLAR-FM in Bacalar, Quintana Roo
XHMZA-FM in Cihuatlán, Jalisco
XHOCA-FM in Oaxaca, Oaxaca
XHOPE-FM in Mazatlán, Sinaloa
XHPECD-FM in Dolores Hidalgo, Guanajuato
XHPNAV-FM in Navojoa, Sonora
XHSMJ-FM in Santa María Jalapa del Marqués, Oaxaca
XHSOC-FM in Saltillo, Coahuila
XHUNL-FM in Monterrey, Nuevo León
XHVX-FM in Villahermosa (Comalcalco), Tabasco

Netherlands
 Arrow Jazz FM in Mierlo and Breda, North Brabant

Singapore
 Ria 89.7FM in Singapore

United States (Channel 209)
 KACC in Alvin, Texas
  in Emporia, Kansas
  in Visalia, California
 KAUC (FM) in West Clarkston, Washington
 KAWA in Sanger, Texas
  in Gillette, Wyoming
 KAZK in Willcox, Arizona
  in Great Bend, Kansas
  in Booneville, Arkansas
  in Park City, Montana
  in Natchitoches, Louisiana
  in Bemidji, Minnesota
 KCAI in Lodi, California
 KCEU in Price, Utah
 KCLM in Santa Maria, California
  in Fergus Falls, Minnesota
 KCNV in Las Vegas, Nevada
  in Knob Noster, Missouri
  in Colorado Springs, Colorado
 KEUK in Eureka, Montana
  in Los Altos, California
 KGNX in Ballwin, Missouri
 KGRP in Grand Rapids, Minnesota
 KHYS in Hays, Kansas
 KIPE in Pine Hills, California
 KIPM in Waikapu, Hawaii
  in Council Bluffs, Iowa
 KJCV-FM in Country Club, Missouri
 KJMA in Floresville, Texas
 KJSA in Jonesboro, Arkansas
  in Ponca City, Oklahoma
  in Trinidad, Colorado
  in Kirksville, Missouri
 KLCC (FM) in Eugene, Oregon
 KLSF (FM) in Juneau, Alaska
 KLTB in Brownfield, Texas
 KLXP in Randsburg, California
 KLYX in Pioche, Nevada
  in Las Cruces, New Mexico
  in Rolla, Missouri
 KMOA in Nu'uuli, American Samoa
 KMSU in Mankato, Minnesota
  in Mount Vernon, Washington
 KNCA in Burney, California
  in Potosi, Missouri
  in Bismarck, North Dakota
 KNSY in Dubuque, Iowa
 KNVM in Prunedale, California
 KOAC-FM in Astoria, Oregon
 KOJD in John Day, Oregon
 KOTD in The Dalles, Oregon
  in Branson, Missouri
 KPCS (FM) in Princeton, Minnesota
  in Whitehall, Montana
 KRLE in Carbon Hill, Alabama
  in Red Mesa, Arizona
  in Iowa City, Iowa
 KRYJ in Craig, Colorado
  in Riverside, California
 KTDB in Ramah, New Mexico
  in Pagosa Springs, Colorado
  in Beaumont, Texas
 KTYR in Trinity, Texas
  in Pine Bluff, Arkansas
 KUBJ in Brenham, Texas
 KUMB in Hollywood, Mississippi
 KUMM in Morris, Minnesota
 KUSD (FM) in Vermillion, South Dakota
  in Farmington, New Mexico
 KUWE in Evanston, Wyoming
 KVCI in Montezuma, Iowa
 KVRG in Chillicothe, Texas
 KWFJ in Roy, Washington
 KWJP in Paola, Kansas
 KWTR in Eldorado, Texas
  in Walla Walla, Washington
 KXGR in Loveland, Colorado
  in Mccarthy, Alaska
  in Benton, Kentucky
  in Alfred, New York
  in Ripley, Tennessee
  in Lawrenceburg, Tennessee
 WBCW in Upland, Indiana
  in Mount Vernon, Illinois
  in East Saint Louis, Illinois
 WCPE in Raleigh, North Carolina
  in Somerset, Kentucky
  in Somers, Connecticut
 WDVR in Delaware Township, New Jersey
  in Wilmington, North Carolina
  in Kingston, New York
 WGBH (FM) in Boston, Massachusetts
  in Pilot Mountain, North Carolina
  in Glassboro, New Jersey
 WHFW in Winchester, Virginia
 WHND in Sister Bay, Wisconsin
 WHPA (FM) in Macomb, Illinois
 WISU in Terre Haute, Indiana
 WITR in Henrietta, New York
 WJHO in Alexander City, Alabama
  in New Smyrna Beach, Florida
 WJOJ in Rust Township, Michigan
 WKKM in Speaker Township, Michigan
 WKSU in Kent, Ohio
  in Dannemora, New York
 WLMN in Manistee, Michigan
  in Lansing, Michigan
 WLOL-FM in Star City, West Virginia
  in Grand Marais, Minnesota
  in Springfield, Illinois
 WLXW in Waynesboro, Mississippi
  in Calais, Maine
  in Waterville, Maine
 WMHK in Columbia, South Carolina
 WMLV in Miami, Florida
  in Cochran, Georgia
 WNHG in Grand Rapids, Michigan
  in Jamestown, New York
  in Atlantic City, New Jersey
 WNOC in Bowling Green, Ohio
 WNUX in Montgomery, West Virginia
  in Olivet, Michigan
  in Crothersville, Indiana
  in Kankakee, Illinois
  in Columbus, Ohio
  in Centreville, Mississippi
  in Johnstown, Pennsylvania
  in Freehold Township, New Jersey
 WRFI in Odessa, New York
  in Greenfield, Indiana
  in Oneonta, New York
 WRIQ in Charles City, Virginia
 WRRJ in Cocoa Beach, Florida
  in San Juan, Puerto Rico
  in Schenectady, New York
  in Shepherdstown, West Virginia
 WSPB in Bedford, Michigan
 WSSH in Lisbon, New Hampshire
  in Saratoga Springs, New York
 WTAC in Burton, Michigan
 WTBP in Bath, Maine
  in Pittsfield, Massachusetts
  in Findlay, Ohio
  in Towson, Maryland
  in Toccoa Falls, Georgia
  in South Bend, Indiana
  in Eau Claire, Wisconsin
  in Tampa, Florida
 WUWM in Milwaukee, Wisconsin
  in Tallahassee, Florida
 WVGV in West Union, West Virginia
  in Monterey, Virginia
 WVYA in Williamsport, Pennsylvania
 WWQE in Elberton, Georgia
 WXLD in Lowville, New York
 WXMD in California, Maryland
 WYBK in Chattanooga, Tennessee
 WYHH in Highland Heights, Kentucky

References

Lists of radio stations by frequency